Callia xanthomera is a species of beetle in the family Cerambycidae. It was described by Redtenbacher in 1867. It is known from Argentina, Paraguay, and Brazil.

References

Calliini
Beetles described in 1867